Jerusalem Retreat Center is a Catholic charismatic renewal centre in Thalore, Thrissur city. The centre is managed by the Carmelites of Mary Immaculate, Thrissur. The centre comes under Syro-Malabar Catholic Archdiocese of Thrissur.

Jerusalem retreat centre occupies a unique position among the spiritual pilgrim centres in India. Charismatic retreats are conducted in Malayalam, Tamil, and English every month round the year. This Centre is promoted and owned by the Carmelites of Mary Immaculate(CMI) congregation. Jerusalem has been propagating the Word of God, since its formation in 1992. People come for spiritual rejuvenation and liberation from the evils, bondage of alcohol and drug addiction. Many sick and ailing people are healed. After long years of issue-less married life, barren women are bearing fruit of their ardent prayer. The powerful presence of Jesus Christ is felt. The sick were healed, sinner were forgiven, the bondages were broken, The good news of salvation has instilled a new hope in the hearts of people irrespective of caste and religion.

Jerusalem Campus: Jerusalem is a sprawling beautiful location on the sides of National Highway-47 Mannuthy Thalore by Pass junction, Thrissur district Kerala,  India. The spot was handpicked by the Lord himself.

How to reach Jerusalem: Jerusalem is 10 km away from Thrissur town, which is also the district headquarters. Every train stops at Thrissur railway station. The pilgrim traveling by road from south Kerala, come a head-on NH-47 to Thalore bye-pass junction. The nearest airport KOCHI International Airport(Nedumaserry) is one hour drive to the centre. Trivandrum, Kovai(Coimbatore), Trichy, Chennai are the other nearby airports. The centre has made travel arrangement from railway station and airport.

References

Archdiocese of Thrissur
Tourist attractions in Thrissur
1995 establishments in Kerala